HD 201298 (HR 8090) is a solitary star located in the northern constellation Equuleus just next to 3 Equulei It has an apparent magnitude of 6.14, making it barely visible to the naked eye under ideal conditions.

HD 201298 has a stellar classification of M0 III, indicating that it is ageing M-type star that is probably on the red giant branch. As a result, it has expanded to 117 times the Sun's girth.

Note

References 

Equuleus
M-type giants
201298
8090
Equulei, 12
104357
Durchmusterung objects